Julian Lee Moriarty (born July 24, 1994) is an American professional wrestler signed to All Elite Wrestling (AEW), where he is a member of the stable the Firm.

Professional wrestling career
Lee Moriarty began training professional wrestling in February 2015 under Brandon K and Dean Ratford in Pro Wrestling eXpress (PWX) near his home city of Pittsburgh. He made his debut within the same year.

In August 2021, Moriarty was booked to his first match in All Elite Wrestling (AEW) for a taped episode of AEW Dark. He signed with the promotion two months later. In the lead up to All Out 2022, Moriarty was recruited by Stokely Hathaway along with Ethan Page, Colten Gunn, Austin Gunn, and W. Morrissey. On the September 14 episode of AEW Dynamite, the name of his group was revealed to be "The Firm" and that they were MJF's "retainer team" helping him whenever he would need them.

Championships and accomplishments
 Daily Wrestling
 Match Madness (2021)
 Enjoy Wrestling
 Enjoy Cup Championship (1 time)
 Enjoy Cup Championship Tournament (2021)
 IndependentWrestling.TV
 IWTV Independent Wrestling Championship (1 time)
 The Masked Wrestler Tournament (2020)
 Lucha Memes Battle of Coacalco (2021)
 Pro Wrestling eXpress PWX Heavyweight Championship (1 time)
 PWX Three Rivers Championship (2 times)
 PWX Tag Team Championship (1 time) - with (Crusher Hansen, Samuel Adams, Dirk Ciglar, and Gannon Jones Jr.)
 10th Annual Shawn 'Shocker' Evans Memorial Tournament (2017)
 PWX Heavyweight Championship Tournament (2016)
 Pro Wrestling Illustrated Ranked No. 47 of the top 500 singles wrestlers in the PWI 500 in 2021
 Quaker City Wrestling QCW Heavyweight Championship (1 time)
 Ryse Wrestling'''
 Ryse Grand Championship (1 time)

References

External links 
 
 
 

1995 births
21st-century professional wrestlers
African-American male professional wrestlers
All Elite Wrestling personnel
American male professional wrestlers
Living people
People from Pittsburgh
Professional wrestlers from Pennsylvania